Florida Amendment 2 is an amendment made to the Constitution of Florida in 2008. It added Article I, Section 27 to the constitution, which defines marriage as a union only between one man and one woman, and thus bans the creation of similar unions, such as civil unions or same-sex marriage.

Since 2014, the measure has been litigated in court and has been struck down by multiple state courts so far in several counties of southern Florida.

Same-sex marriage became legal in Florida when the decision in the federal case Brenner v. Scott found the amendments banning same-sex marriage (including Amendment 2) to be unconstitutional.

Background 

Florida previously had banned same-sex marriage on multiple occasions and upheld their decision on it through court. in 1977, Governor Reubin Askew signed a bill banning homosexuals from marrying and adoption. In 1997, the "Defense of Marriage Act" was enacted by the Florida legislature which again codified that marriage was between a man and a woman and prevented the state from recognizing any same-sex marriages performed out of the state. In 2005, the case Wilson v. Ake occurred at the United States District Court for the Middle District of Florida in which a lesbian couple attempted to have their same-sex marriage from Massachusetts recognized. The case resulted in judge James S. Moody Jr. upholding the same-sex marriage ban.

Campaign

The amendment was proposed in an initiative by Florida4Marriage. Although same-sex marriage had already banned same-sex marriage, some worried that a court case such as Wilson v. Ake could possibly overturn the same-sex marriage ban. Proposed constitutional amendments in Florida require 611,009 signatures, including at least 8% of voters in the last presidential election and at least 8% of voters in each congressional district of Florida. The initiative would later pass and be certified with 649,346 signatures and was placed on the ballot in February 2008. 60% of voters were required to pass the amendment in Florida.

Similar proposals were put to a vote at the same time in Arizona and California.

A Quinnipiac University Polling Institute poll on September 8, 2008, showed that 55% favored the proposed amendment, while 41% oppose it.

Voting for the amendment began on November 4, 2008.

Results 
Amendment 2 added Article I Section 27 of the Florida constitution. This states:

The amendment was ultimately passed by a margin of 61.9% in favor and 38.1% opposed. In the Florida 2008 election, Barack Obama voters as a whole voted 57% against Amendment 2 while John McCain voters voted 81% in favor of the legislation. Republican Governor Charlie Crist publicly supported Amendment 2.

Monroe County was the only county to have a majority of the voters reject the amendment by a margin of 1,580 votes.

Florida joined 27 other states that approved other same-sex marriage bans such as this.

Aftermath and legal challenges 

Since the beginning of 2014, several couples and plaintiffs have sued the state of Florida over the amendment, as part of a larger, concentrated effort by gay rights activists and groups encouraged by the federal Supreme Court's decisions regarding marriage made the previous year. Multiple state lawsuits against the amendment have already been successful so far, succeeding in the amendment being struck down successively in Monroe, Miami-Dade, and Broward counties. On August 5, 2014, a Palm Beach County judge issued a ruling in a case pertaining to a surviving spouse's rights in a specific estate case which resulted in the union of a widow and her deceased wife as the first ever same-sex marriage officially recognized in Florida.

Florida Attorney General Pam Bondi, a Republican up for reelection in 2014 considered vulnerable due to association with Governor Rick Scott, has been a staunch defender of the amendment in court. Critics have pointed to her two previous divorces as a cause for hypocrisy when compared to her statements about the sanctity of marriage. Bondi has appealed all state court rulings thus far, which, as required by Florida law, automatically stays the rulings until the beginning of the appeal process.

The rulings against the amendment have been welcome by gay rights groups, the activist gay community in southern Florida, both Democratic gubernatorial candidates, and it appears a majority of Floridians, as at least one recent poll by the conservative-leaning firm Quinnipiac now shows that 56% of likely voters now favor marriage equality, a near-total reversal since 2008.

Concurrently with the lawsuits and rulings, a governor's race took place in 2014 and both leading candidates had completely opposite views on the issue of marriage. Incumbent Governor Rick Scott is opposed to marriage equality. Former governor and Democratic primary candidate Charlie Crist, who has changed parties since 2008, now supports same-sex marriage and ran on a platform that included giving same-sex couples the right to marry.

See also 
 LGBT rights in Florida
 Same-sex marriage in Florida
 Recognition of same-sex unions in Florida

References

External links
 Yes2Marriage.org (Amendment 2 proponents)
 SayNo2.com (Amendment 2 opponents)
 The Money Behind the 2008 Same-Sex Partnership Ballot Measures - The National Institute On Money In State Politics

2008 in LGBT history
2008 Florida elections
2008 ballot measures
Florida ballot measures
Initiatives in the United States
LGBT in Florida
U.S. state constitutional amendments banning same-sex unions
Same-sex marriage ballot measures in the United States